Clarence House is a royal residence on The Mall in the City of Westminster, London. It was built in 1825–1827, adjacent to St James's Palace, for the Duke of Clarence, the future king William IV.

The four-storey house is faced in pale stucco.  Over the years, it has undergone much extensive remodelling and reconstruction, most notably after being heavily damaged in the Second World War by enemy bombing during The Blitz where little remains of the original structure as designed by John Nash.  It is Grade I listed on the National Heritage List for England. The house is open to visitors for approximately one month each summer, usually in August. 

Clarence House currently serves as the London residence of King Charles III and Queen Camilla. It has been Charles's residence since 2003.  From 1953 until 2002 it was home to Queen Elizabeth The Queen Mother, and before her, it was the official home of her daughter, Princess Elizabeth, the future Queen Elizabeth II.

History

The house was built between 1825 and 1827 to a design by John Nash. It was commissioned by the Duke of Clarence, who in 1830 became King William IV of the United Kingdom (reigned 1830–1837). He lived there in preference to the adjacent St James's Palace, an antiquated Tudor building which he found too cramped.

From William IV, the house passed to his sister Princess Augusta Sophia, and, following her death in 1840, to Queen Victoria's mother, Princess Victoria of Saxe-Coburg-Saalfeld. In 1866 it became the home of Queen Victoria's second son Alfred, Duke of Saxe-Coburg and Gotha (also Duke of Edinburgh), until his death in 1900.

Alfred's younger brother Prince Arthur, Duke of Connaught and Strathearn, Queen Victoria's third son, used the house from 1900 until his death in 1942. During his tenure, for a brief period in the 1930s, it was the location of the library of the School of Oriental and African Studies, until all universities in London were evacuated in 1939 and the school temporarily relocated to Cambridge.

During World War II, Clarence House suffered damage by enemy bombing during The Blitz (1940–1941). Following the death of the Duke of Connaught in 1942, it was used by the Red Cross and the St John Ambulance Brigade as their headquarters during the rest of World War II.

Following their marriage in 1947, it became the residence of Princess Elizabeth and her husband, Prince Philip, Duke of Edinburgh. Their daughter, Princess Anne, was born there in August 1950. In 1953, after the death of her father King George VI (d. 6 February 1952), Princess Elizabeth acceded to the throne as Queen Elizabeth II and moved to Buckingham Palace. Her mother, Queen Elizabeth The Queen Mother, and sister Princess Margaret moved into Clarence House. 

Princess Margaret later moved into an apartment in Kensington Palace following her marriage in 1960, whilst the Queen Mother remained in residence at Clarence House, until her death in March 2002.  Charles, at that time Prince of Wales, took up residence in 2003. Clarence House was also the official residence of Prince William from 2003 until April 2011, and of Prince Harry from 2003 until March 2012.

Currently, Clarence House is the London residence of King Charles III and his wife, Queen Camilla. The King and Queen consort will continue to utilize Clarence House as their London home until at least 2027 while renovations to Buckingham Palace are ongoing. Buckingham Palace will remain the administrative headquarters for the monarchy and location of state events during this time.

See also
Birkhall – a house in Aberdeenshire, Scotland; inherited by Charles III from Queen Elizabeth The Queen Mother
Highgrove House – a house near Tetbury, Gloucestershire; the family residence of Charles III and Camilla; owned by the Duchy of Cornwall
Llwynywermod – a house in Carmarthenshire, Wales; owned by the Duchy of Cornwall

References

External links

Clarence House at the Royal Family website
Clarence House, at The Royal Collection – Visitor Information
Clarence House, Official website of the Prince of Wales

Houses in the City of Westminster
Historic house museums in London
Museums in the City of Westminster
Royal buildings in London
Royal residences in the United Kingdom
Grade I listed houses in London
Grade I listed buildings in the City of Westminster
Houses completed in 1827
1827 architecture
1827 establishments in England
John Nash buildings
Neoclassical architecture in London
Buildings and structures on The Mall, London
Regency architecture in London
William IV of the United Kingdom